Stolen Continents is a 1992 non-fiction book by Ronald Wright that covers the colonial theft of land between 1492 and 1990. It specific focuses on activities directed towards the Maya, Inca, Aztec, Cherokee, and Iroquois peoples.

The book won the Gordon Montador Award in 1993.

Synopsis 
Stolen Continents covers the period 1492 to 1990 and documents five examples of the colonial theft of land from Maya, Inca, Aztec, Cherokee, and Iroquois people. Wright breaks each example into three stages: initial contact, violent struggles, and modern resistance. The book uses contemporary accounts from native peoples.

Critical reception 
The writer T. F. Rigelhof described the book as "remarkable" and "essential reading." The archaeologist Brian M. Fagan was critical of what he saw as Wright's prioritisation of indigenous perspectives, which he claimed made the book unbalanced.

Stolen Continents won the Gordon Montador Award in 1993.

See also 

 A Short History of Progress (book by the same author)
 What Is America? (book by the same author)

References

External links 

 Wright's response to Fagan's review, The New York Times letters section, June 28, 1992.

1992 non-fiction books
History books about genocide
History books about colonialism
Books about Native American history
Books about indigenous peoples
Books about foreign relations of the United States
History of the Maya civilization
Inca Empire
History of the Aztecs
Conquistadors
Cherokee in popular culture
Iroquois
Canadian non-fiction books
Mesoamerican studies books